Hemeroplanis scopulepes, the variable tropic, is a moth in the family Erebidae. The species was first described by Adrian Hardy Haworth in 1809. It is found in North America.

The MONA or Hodges number for Hemeroplanis scopulepes is 8467.

References

Further reading

External links

 

Boletobiinae
Articles created by Qbugbot
Moths described in 1809